Penn Township is a township in York County, Pennsylvania, United States. The population was 17,494 at the 2020 census.

Geography
The township encircles the borough of Hanover on three sides, with the York County-Adams County boundary forming the western border of both the township and the borough.

Demographics
At the 2000 census there were 14,592 people, 5,421 households, and 4,103 families living in the township.  The population density was 1,144.2 people per square mile (441.9/km).  There were 5,643 housing units at an average density of 442.5/sq mi (170.9/km).  The racial makeup of the township was 97.46% White, 0.49% African American, 0.17% Native American, 0.82% Asian, 0.02% Pacific Islander, 0.47% from other races, and 0.58% from two or more races. Hispanic or Latino of any race were 1.05%.

Of the 5,421 households 36.1% had children under the age of 18 living with them, 63.2% were married couples living together, 8.4% had a female householder with no husband present, and 24.3% were non-families. 19.7% of households were one person and 7.4% were one person aged 65 or older.  The average household size was 2.63 and the average family size was 3.02.

The age distribution was 25.9% under the age of 18, 6.4% from 18 to 24, 30.7% from 25 to 44, 22.4% from 45 to 64, and 14.6% 65 or older.  The median age was 38 years. For every 100 females, there were 95.9 males.  For every 100 females age 18 and over, there were 92.6 males.

The median household income was $47,876 and the median family income  was $53,544. Males had a median income of $38,415 versus $24,024 for females. The per capita income for the township was $19,833.  About 2.3% of families and 3.6% of the population were below the poverty line, including 3.8% of those under age 18 and 4.7% of those age 65 or over.

References

Populated places established in 1825
Townships in York County, Pennsylvania
Townships in Pennsylvania